The 1965 German Grand Prix (formally the XXVII Großer Preis von Deutschland) was a Formula One motor race held at Nürburgring on August 1, 1965. It was race 7 of 10 in both the 1965 World Championship of Drivers and the 1965 International Cup for Formula One Manufacturers. The 15-lap race was won by Jim Clark, who in his Lotus-Climax, took pole position, the fastest lap of the race, and led every lap. The victory ensured that Clark won the World Championship of Drivers with three races left to go. It also meant that Lotus won the 1965 International Cup for Formula One Manufacturers at the same time. BRM driver, Graham Hill, finished the race in second position in front of Brabham-Climax driver, Dan Gurney, who completed the podium by finishing third. Clark's victory was his 3rd Grand Slam of the season and the final Grand Slam of his career.

Race report
Graham Hill could still theoretically overhaul Clark for the championship. However Clark became Champion with a masterful performance, leading from pole to the flag and setting fastest lap, to gain maximum points with 3 Grand Prix still to be run. Behind him, the rest of the pack had all sorts of mechanical problems-Surtees had gear selection problems, Stewart bent a wishbone, Hulme punctured his fuel tank when his seat worked loose and Amon had transistor problems despite borrowing two transistor boxes. Clark was duly crowned as champion at the start of August, the earliest the championship had been won until 2002, when Michael Schumacher obtained his 5th title on July 21.

Classification

Qualifying

Race

Championship standings after the race

Drivers' Championship standings

Constructors' Championship standings

 Notes: Only the top five positions are included for both sets of standings. Only best 6 results counted toward the championship. Numbers without parentheses are championship points, numbers in parentheses are total points scored.

References

German Grand Prix
German Grand Prix
German Grand Prix
1965 in German motorsport